Bolkiah, also known as Nakhoda Ragam, was the 5th Sultan of Brunei. He ascended the throne upon the abdication of his father, Sultan Sulaiman, and ruled Brunei from 1485 to 1524. His reign marked the Golden Age of Brunei and saw the Sultanate become a prominent power of the Malay archipelago. Bolkiah frequently traveled abroad to gain new ideas for the development of the country, as well as seeking suggestions from his various chiefs. It is said that his name was kept by his father after the Ba'Alawi Sayyed clan Ba-Awalqhiyyah who had gained control over much of the Yemeni kingdom of Hadhramaut.

Historicity 
He was also mentioned in Silsilah Raja-Raja Berunai, a 19th century manuscript which also describes the same genealogy.

The Bruneian Sultan Salan in Boxer Codex, a 16th century Spanish manuscript, was identified as Bolkiah.

Title 
Bolkiah was known in Bornean and Malay traditions by the title  (Malay, meaning "Singing Captain"). However, it is argued that the title is also given to another Sultan of Brunei and other figures in the Malay archipelago.

Reign 
The reign of Sultan Bolkiah is said to be the golden age of Brunei. His dominion is said to have included present-day Sarawak and Sabah in Borneo, as well as Manila and Sulu Archipelago in the Philippines. There is also the possibility that his sovereignty also extended to Kalimantan, including Sambas, Kotaringin, Pontianak, Banjar, Barau and Bolongan.

Hugh Low, a British colonial administrator in the 19th century, identified Seludong as Manila. However, it was argued that Seludong was not Manila but Serudong River in Sabah, which was said to be controlled by the Sulu Sultanate at that time.

The visit by Antonio Pigafetta to Brunei in 1521 is said to have occurred during his reign.

Sultan Bolkiah's victory over Seludong (modern-day Manila) by defeating Rajah Suko of Tundun in Luzon and as well as his marriage to Laila Menchanai, the daughter of Sulu Sultan Amir Ul-Ombra, widened Brunei's influence in the Philippines.

This increased Brunei's wealth as well as extending Islamic teachings in the region, resulting in the influence and power of Brunei reaching its peak during this period. Bolkiah's rule reached essentially all of coastal Borneo, as far south as Banjarmasin, and as far north as the island of Luzon, including Seludong (present-day Manila) in the Philippines.

Marriage 
One tradition states that Bolkiah married a Javanese princess. It is also said that her followers intermarried with the Bruneian people, which became the ancestors for the Kedayan ethnic group.

Another tradition states that Bolkiah was married to Laila Menchanai, the daughter of Sulu Sultan Amir Ul-Ombra and Datu Kemin.

Death and succession

After his death, he was succeeded by his son, Abdul Kahar. He was buried in Kota Batu with his wife, Princess Leila Mechanai.

See also
 List of Sultans of Brunei

Notes

Citations

References 

 
 
 
 
 
 
 

Bruneian people of Saudi Arabian descent
15th-century Sultans of Brunei
16th-century Sultans of Brunei